Tahpanhes or Tehaphnehes;  or ; known by the Ancient Greeks as the (Pelusian) Daphnae and Taphnas in the Septuagint, now Tell Defenneh) was a city in ancient Egypt. It was located on Lake Manzala on the Tanitic branch of the Nile, about 26 km (16 miles) from Pelusium. The site is now situated on the Suez Canal.

Name 
The meaning of the name remains uncertain although it appears to be of an Egyptian origin. Biblical scholar John L. McKenzie refers the name to T-h-p-nhsj meaning Fortress of the Nubian, while William Albright adds it means Fortress of Pinehas. Daressy and Spiegelberg connect the name with the hieroglyphic word Tephen.

History
King Psammetichus (664–610 BC) established a garrison of foreign mercenaries at Daphnae, mostly Carians and Ionian Greeks (Herodotus ii. 154).

According to the Hebrew Bible, the Jews from Jerusalem fled to this place after the death of Gedaliah and settled there for a time (Jeremiah 2:16; Jeremiah 43:7,8,9; 44:1; ; Ezekiel ). After Jerusalem was destroyed in 586 BC, the Jewish refugees, including Jeremiah, came to Tahpanhes (Jeremiah 43–44).

A platform of brickwork, which has been tentatively described as the pavement at the entry of Pharaoh's palace, has been discovered at this place. "Here," says the discoverer, William Flinders Petrie, "the ceremony described by Jeremiah ; 'brick-kiln' (i.e. pavement of brick) took place before the chiefs of the fugitives assembled on the platform, and here Nebuchadnezzar II spread his royal pavilion".

When Naucratis was given the monopoly of Greek traffic by Amasis II (570–526 BC), the Greeks were removed from Daphnae and its prosperity never returned; in Herodotus' time the deserted remains of the docks and buildings were visible.

The site was discovered by Sir William Matthew Flinders Petrie in 1886; it was then known by natives as Qasr Bint al-Yahudi, the "Castle of the Jew's Daughter". There is a massive fort and enclosure; the chief discovery was a large number of fragments of pottery, which are of great importance for the chronology of vase-painting, since they must belong to the time between Psammetichus and Amasis, i.e. the end of the 7th or the beginning of the 6th century BC. They show the characteristics of Ionian art, but their shapes and other details testify to their local manufacture.

Egyptologist David Rohl proposed  to identify Tahpanhes with the biblical location of Baal-zephon.

See also
Tell Nebesha

Notes

References
WMF Petrie, "Tanis II., Nebesheh, and Defenneh" (the Memoir of the Egypt Exploration Fund, 1888)
 .

Hebrew Bible cities
Archaeological sites in Egypt
Former populated places in Egypt